Just Like Me may refer to:

 "Just Like Me" (Paul Revere & the Raiders song), 1965
 "Just Like Me" (Disney song), 1994
 "Just Like Me" (Usher song), 1997
 "Just Like Me" (Holly Valance song), 2003
 "Just Like Me" (Jamie Foxx song), 2008
 "Just Like Me" (Britney Spears song), 2016
 "Just Like Me" (A Boogie wit da Hoodie song), 2018
 "Just Like Me", a song from the 1976 album Rose of Cimarron by Poco
 "Just Like Me", a song from Songs (Fra Lippo Lippi album), 1985
 "Just Like Me", a song from the 1990 album Smell the Magic by L7
 "Just Like Me", a song from the 2004 album Size Matters by Helmet
 "Just Like Me", a song featuring Sarah McLachlan from the 2006 album Checks Thugs and Rock n Roll by DMC
 "Just Like Me", a song by Jeff Hanson from the 2003 album Son
 Just Like Me, a 1981 album by Terry Gregory
 Just Like Me, a 2011 album by Alex Chu